Tears of Blood is a 1972 West German-French drama film directed by Alfred Vohrer. It was entered into the 8th Moscow International Film Festival.

Cast
 Alain Noury as Alain
 Anita Lochner as Christine
 Wolfgang Reichmann as Luba
 Malte Thorsten as Martin
 Eva Christian as Karin
 Ruth Maria Kubitschek as Irene
 Konrad Georg
 Henry Vahl as Brodersen
 Alf Marholm as Vater Täumer

References

External links
 

1972 films
1972 romantic drama films
German romantic drama films
West German films
French romantic drama films
1970s German-language films
Films directed by Alfred Vohrer
Films based on works by Aleksandr Pushkin
Films set in West Germany
1970s German films
1970s French films